Paulo Ferreira-Mendes (born May 13, 1990) is a Brazilian footballer who plays for Puerto Rico FC in the North American Soccer League.

Club career
In 2012, Paulo Mendes and his twin brother Pedro signed with the Atlanta Silverbacks of the North American Soccer League after a successful stint at amateur side Cal FC, where he played in 2 Lamar Hunt U.S. Open Cup games. In his first season with Atlanta, Mendes played 10 games, scoring once.

After the 2012 season, Paulo joined the New York Cosmos where he won the Fall Championship, where he scored twice in 8 games. The Cosmos defeated the Silverbacks in 2013 Soccer Bowl.

In 2014, Paulo played 7 games, scoring once, in the Spring Championship. The Cosmos attempted to send him on loan to Venezuelan Primera División side Metropolitanos FC but after the loan was never finalized, he and the Cosmos mutually agreed to part ways. He finished the 2014 season with the Atlanta Silverbacks.

On 26 February 2016 Paulo joined twin brother Pedro at Puerto Rico FC.

Career statistics

Honours

Club
New York Cosmos
NASL 2013 Fall Championship
NASL Soccer Bowl 2013

External links
 Atlanta Silverbacks bio

References

1990 births
Living people
Brazilian footballers
Brazilian expatriate footballers
Cal FC players
Atlanta Silverbacks players
New York Cosmos (2010) players
Association football midfielders
Expatriate soccer players in the United States
North American Soccer League players
Sportspeople from Goiânia